The Digital Transformation Agency (DTA) is an agency of the Australian Government tasked with improving the accessibility and availability of government services online by helping government "transform services to be simple, clear and fast." Succeeding the Digital Transformation Office, the DTA was established on 14 October 2016.

The agency has the stated goal of overseeing the "Digital Transformation Strategy" for the Australian Government to become "one of the leading digital governments in the world by 2025". Generally the agency oversees various interdepartmental government projects and provides consultancy and products to other official bodies.

Platforms 
The DTA is responsible for the management and maintenance of several different whole-of-government platforms, including:

 myGov, and its upcoming successor, GOVDXP
 Coronavirus Australia
 COVIDSafe
 australia.gov.au

History

The DTA's predecessor is the Digital Transformation Office, which was formed on 23 January 2015. The office was in charge of digitizing and managing various government services. This agency was primarily responsible for managing the myGov website and app. On 14 October 2016 it was renamed to the Digital Transformation Agency.

References

External links

Official 
 Digital Transformation Agency: Official website

Government agencies established in 2016
2016 establishments in Australia
Commonwealth Government agencies of Australia